Bhanotia pauciradiata (few-rayed pipefish) is a little known marine fish of the family Syngnathidae. This species is ovoviviparous, with the male carrying eggs in its brood pouch until giving birth to live young.

References

Further reading
World Register of Marine Species

Fish described in 1995
Syngnathidae